The 1975 Pacific Tigers football team represented the University of the Pacific (UOP) in the 1975 NCAA Division I football season as a member of the Pacific Coast Athletic Association.

The team was led by head coach Chester Caddas, in his fourth year, and played their home games at Pacific Memorial Stadium in Stockton, California. They finished the season with a record of five wins, six losses and one tie (5–6–1, 2–3 PCAA).

Schedule

Notes

References

Pacific
Pacific Tigers football seasons
Pacific Tigers football